Macna camiguina is a species of snout moth in the genus Macna. It was described by Georg Semper in 1899 and is known from the Philippines. It was described from Camiguin de Mindanao, from which its species epithet is derived.

References

Moths described in 1899
Pyralini